Walter Löber (born 29 June 1909, date of death unknown) was a German racing cyclist. He won the German National Road Race in 1939.

References

External links
 

1909 births
Year of death missing
German male cyclists
Cyclists from Frankfurt
German cycling road race champions
20th-century German people